Chimborazo Airport  is an airport serving the city of Riobamba in Chimborazo Province, Ecuador.

The Riobamba non-directional beacon (ident: RIO) is located on the field.

See also

 List of airports in Ecuador
 Transport in Ecuador

References

External links
 HERE Maps - Chimborazo
 OpenStreetMap - Chimborazo
 OurAirports - Chimborazo
 FallingRain - Chimborazo
 

Airports in Ecuador